Vist (also Romanized as Vīst) is a city in the Central District of Khansar County, Isfahan Province, Iran. At the 2016 census, its population was 2514.

References 

Populated places in Khansar County